Pépé Felly Manuaku, also known as Pépé Fely (or Felly) is a Congolese Rumba guitarist, songwriter, producer, arranger, Bandleader and lyricist from the Democratic Republic of Congo. He has been described as the foremost Congolese solo guitarist of his generation. He is a founding member of the iconic groups Zaïko Langa Langa, Les Ya Toupas and Grand Zaïko Wawa. His style of guitar is the last style officially credited as a "School" or Genre of guitar following the styles "Fiesta" created by "Le Docteur" Nico Kassanda and "Odemba" created by "Le Sorcier" Franco Luambo Makiadi. He is credited with establishing the guitar as the lead instrument in contemporary Congolese music introducing Synthesiser, Bouzouki, Advanced Guitar effect pedal techniques, new arrangement and recording techniques.

Pepe Felly Manuaku is a Congolese Rumba Guitarist from the Democratic Republic of Congo. He was born in the mountain region of Zoma in what is now Angola. Zoma is known as a royal village in the time of the Kongolese Empire. His Grandfather, Manuel d'Oliveira was a pioneer of early Congolese Music with his group San Salvador. His uncle is Armando Brazzos, author composer and bassist on the iconic " Indépendance Cha-Cha" by Grand Kalle and African Jazz.

A graduate of the Kinshasa Académie des Beaux-Arts, he was one of the founders of the popular Congolese musical group Zaiko Langa Langa, and his rapid guitar-playing style was a distinctive feature of the group's music. In Zaiko Langa Langa he attracted critical praise for his ability to play continuously without a break, and earned the sobriquet "the hardest left hand in Zaire". He was noted also for his mastery of the sebene technique.

He left Zaiko Langa Langa in 1979 to found another group, the award-winning Grand Zaiko Wawa, which in turn cultivated a new generation of prominent Congolese musicians.

After teaching as a guest lecturer in the University of Limerick Irish World Music Academy in 2017, Pépé Felly Manuaku has now joined Elikya Band as musical director. .

References

External links
 Zaiko Langa Langa Official Site

Soukous musicians
Democratic Republic of the Congo guitarists
Living people
People from Kinshasa
1954 births
21st-century Democratic Republic of the Congo people